The Hauge Bjerge Formation is a formation of the Peary Land Group in Greenland. It preserves fossils dating back to the Silurian period.

See also

 List of fossiliferous stratigraphic units in Greenland
 Haug Range

References
 

Silurian Greenland